The Eland Mountains are a range of mountains which rise above  and extend about  in a northeast–southwest direction along the south side of Clifford Glacier,  northeast of the Clark Hills on the east coast of Palmer Land. The mountains were discovered in 1936 by the British Graham Land Expedition, and they appear in aerial photographs taken by the United States Antarctic Service in September 1940. During 1947 they were photographed from the air by members of the Ronne Antarctic Research Expedition, who in conjunction with the Falkland Islands Dependencies Survey (FIDS), charted them from the ground. The name Eland, Lady Clifford's maiden name, was given in 1952 by Sir Miles Clifford, Governor of the Falkland Islands, at the request of members of the FIDS staff.

See also 
Hall Ridge

References 

Mountain ranges of Palmer Land